Ed Stanford Russenholt (May 18, 1890 – February 3, 1991, aged 101) was best known as CBC Manitoba's first weather person. He was born in Uxbridge, Ontario. He was replaced in that task in 1962 by news reader Maurice Burchell.

He wrote a book on the history of Assiniboia, The Heart of the Continent: being the history of Assiniboia - the truly typical Canadian community, and edited a book on Rockwood, Manitoba, Re-echoes from Rockwood.

References

External links
 Manitoba Historical Society - Ed Russenholt Bio

1890 births
1991 deaths
Canadian television meteorologists
People from Uxbridge, Ontario
Writers from Ontario
Canadian centenarians
Men centenarians
20th-century Canadian historians